St Agnes Catholic High School is an independent Roman Catholic co-educational secondary day school, located in Rooty Hill, in the western suburbs of Sydney, New South Wales, Australia. The school caters for approximately 800 students from Year 7 to Year 12 and draws students from St Aidan's Primary, Rooty Hill, Sacred Heart Primary, Mount Druitt, and St John Vianney's Primary, Doonside, as well as a number of other schools in the surrounding suburbs. It also serves the parishes of St Aidan's Rooty Hill, Sacred Heart South Mount Druitt, Holy Family Emerton and St John Vianney's Doonside. The school is a Franciscan Missionaries of Mary school maintaining the Franciscan spirit of simplicity, acceptance of all and a deep personal love of Jesus.

Crest and motto
The St Agnes Catholic High School crest contains features of crests that schools established by the Franciscan Missionaries of Mary have. The barque represents the journey that the Franciscan Missionaries of Mary took to other lands to spread the Catholic Faith. The Greek letters, ρ and χ on the sail of the barque are the first letters of the Latin, Christus Resurexit - Christ is risen. The motto "To Truth Through Love" is used by all Franciscan Missionaries of Mary schools to highlight the schools' approach to educating the whole person.

History
When St Agnes’ College (as it was originally called) was established in 1962 by the Franciscan Missionaries of Mary, the school had 29 female students and three staff members, including founding Principal Sister Marcionelle (Burtille Hayes). In 1976, the school administration was handed over to laypersons when the Franciscan Missionaries of Mary transferred the school to the Sydney Archdiocese.

The original building (now the administrations block) has a long history, having been granted by Governor Evans to a Rooty Hill station master, Captain Minchin, in the 1880s. In 1936, the building, dubbed "Fairholme", began use as a guest house, eventually becoming a golf clubhouse before being purchased by the Epileptic Society and, later, the Franciscan Missionaries of Mary. The school was opened to male students in 1979. 20 years later, in 1999, it was incorporated into Christ Catholic College, but separated out again in 2004 when a multi-school review determined that it and other schools bundled in Christ Catholic Church should function separately.

The school maintains a Franciscan focus on simplicity, tolerance and Christianity.

Learning
St Agnes teaches the same curriculum as government schools. There is however, a strong religious dimension across the curriculum which is most obvious in the subject of Religious Education.  The formal Religious Education program follows the diocesan program, ‘Sharing Our Story’. All students study Religious Education as part of their studies. A formal Pastoral Care program is delivered by the Personal Development, Health and Physical Education faculty as an adjunct to the PDHPE program and responds to the needs of each year group.

Individual teaching programs have been developed for all funded special needs students.  A specialised reading program has been developed for students who are experiencing difficulties in reading.

Targeted Year 10 students are involved in extension classes at Loyola Senior High School in Key Learning Areas. The school is also involved in a number of co-curricular activities.

See also 

 List of Catholic schools in New South Wales
 Catholic education in Australia

References

External links
St Agnes Catholic High School Website
Catholic Education, Diocese of Parramatta

Educational institutions established in 1962
Roman Catholic Diocese of Parramatta
1962 establishments in Australia
Rooty Hill, New South Wales
Catholic secondary schools in Sydney